The Otaki was a sailing ship of the New Zealand Shipping Company. It was built in 1875 by Palmers at Jarrow-on-Tyne. It once made a run from Port Chalmers to London in 1877, taking only 63 days to make the trip.

It was later sold to Germans, renamed Dr. Siegert, and wrecked in 1896.

References

Ships of New Zealand
Ships of the New Zealand Shipping Company